Rychnów may refer to the following places:
Rychnów, Greater Poland Voivodeship (west-central Poland)
Rychnów, Opole Voivodeship (south-west Poland)
Rychnów, West Pomeranian Voivodeship (north-west Poland)